Tucetona bicolor is a species of dog cockle. Its shell is subtrigonal with 39 radial ribs. The ribs have with moderately shallow, very narrow interspaces, with very fine, very closely spaced commarginal ribs. The hinge plate is moderately wide and curved.

References 

Glycymerididae
Bivalves described in 1843